Drift is the fifth album by American thrash metal band Flotsam and Jetsam. It was released on April 25, 1995, and is the last of three albums the band released on MCA Records.

The album marked something of a departure from Flotsam and Jetsam's previous works. On it, the band musically and lyrically incorporated some elements of industrial music, groove metal and alternative metal, almost completely abandoning their thrashier sound.

Drift was re-released on June 10, 2008 by Metal Mind Productions. The release is remastered with three bonus tracks and limited to 2,000 copies. It also contains new packaging and liner notes from band members Eric A.K., Jason Ward and Ed Carlson.

Track listing
All songs written by Kelly David-Smith, Eric A.K., Edward Carlson, Michael Gilbert, Jason Ward, Eric Braverman, except where noted

Credits
 Kelly David-Smith – drums
 Edward Carlson – guitars
 Eric A.K. – vocals
 Jason Ward – bass
 Michael Gilbert – guitars

References 

1995 albums
Flotsam and Jetsam (band) albums
Albums produced by Neil Kernon